Lindsay Mccabe (born ) is a Canadian female volleyball player. She is part of the Canada women's national volleyball team.

She participated in the 2015 FIVB Volleyball World Grand Prix.
On club level she played for Syracuse University in 2015.

References

1992 births
Living people
Canadian women's volleyball players
Place of birth missing (living people)
Syracuse Orange women's volleyball players
Expatriate volleyball players in the United States
Canadian expatriate sportspeople in the United States